The Fonghuanggu Bird and Ecology Park is a bird park in Lugu Township, Nantou County, Taiwan.

History
In 1978, the Taiwan Provincial Government decided to build a bird park in Fonghuanggu Scenic Area located in Nantou County and named it Fonghuanggu Bird Park. In April 1979, the Taiwan Provincial Consultative Council passed the proposal to establish the Fonghuanggu Bird Park Planning Committee which would be given task to collect information and conduct site surveys for the bird park construction. After several years the construction planning was completed. The construction was completed at the end of October 1982 and the park was opened on 18 December 1982. On 1 January 2013, the management of the bird park was given to National Museum of Natural Science and the bird park was renamed as Fonghuanggu Bird and Ecology Park.

Architecture
Covering an area of 30 hectares, the bird park is located at the foothill of Mount Fonghuang at an altitude of 650–850 meters above sea level. The area surrounding it is home to various species of wild birds, insects and reptiles. The bird park houses ten aviaries which are linked together with a 2-km long walking trail. The mesh enclosures are 8-story high. It also features a crane museum named Songher Museum.

Exhibitions

The bird park is home to more than one hundred species of rare birds.
 Garden of Cranes
 Garden of Pheasants
 Rainforest Area
 Garden of Rare Birds
 Garden of Raptors
 Garden of Peacock
 Garden of Flightless Birds
 Garden of Warbler
 Garden of Endemic Species

Transportation
The bird park is accessible by bus from Taichung.

See also
 List of tourist attractions in Taiwan

References

External links

 

1982 establishments in Taiwan
Bird parks
Buildings and structures completed in 1982
Buildings and structures in Nantou County
Tourist attractions in Nantou County
Zoos in Taiwan